Hack is a surname, given name, and nickname. Notable people with the name include:

People with the surname 
 Alexander Hack (born 1993), German footballer
 Dave Hack (born 1972), Canadian Football retired offensive lineman
 Dorothy Weisel Hack (1910–1963), American amateur tennis player
 Edward Hack (1913–1987), English cricketer
 Franz Hack (1915–1997), German SS officer during World War II
 Frederick Hack (1877–1939), Australian cricketer
 Hermann Josef Hack (born 1956), German artist
 Howard Hack (1932–2015), American artist
 Jefferson Hack (born 1971), Uruguayan journalist and magazine editor
 Jodi Hack, American politician elected to the Oregon House of Representatives in 2014
 John Barton Hack (1805–1884), settler in South Australia
 John Tilton Hack (1913–1991), American geomorphologist 
 Karl Hack (born 1966), historian of Southeast Asia, empire and counter-insurgency
 Lester G. Hack (1844–1928), American Civil War soldier awarded the Medal of Honor
 Margherita Hack (1922–2013), Italian astrophysicist
 Maria Hack (1777–1844), English writer of educational books for children
 Olivia Hack (born 1983), American voice actress
 Petra Hack (born 1970), German model
 Richard Hack (born 1951), American writer
 Sabine Hack (born 1969), German tennis player
 Shelley Hack (born 1947), American model and actress
 Stan Hack (1909–1979), American Major League Baseball player and manager
 Wilton Hack (1843–1923), Australian artist, traveller, lecturer and utopist

People with the given name 
 Henry Hack Eibel (1893–1945), Major League Baseball utility player in the 1912 and 1920 seasons
 Hack Kampmann (1856–1920), Danish architect and professor of architecture

People with the nickname 
 David Hackworth (1930–2005), United States Army soldier and military journalist
 Hack Miller (1894–1971), American Major League Baseball player
 Hack Miller (catcher) (1913–1966), American Major League Baseball catcher
 Hack Schumann (1884–1946), American Major League Baseball pitcher
 Hack Simmons (1885–1942), Major League Baseball player
 Hack Simpson (1909–1978), Canadian Olympic ice hockey player
 Hack Spencer (1885–1969), Major League Baseball pitcher in one game
 Hack Wilson (1900–1948), American Hall-of-Fame Major League Baseball player

See also 

Lists of people by nickname